Aquimarina rubra  is a Gram-negative, rod-shaped and non-motile bacterium from the genus of Aquimarina which has been isolated from sediments from a pond which was cultivated with sea cucumbers from Rongcheng in China.

References

External links
Type strain of Aquimarina rubra at BacDive -  the Bacterial Diversity Metadatabase

Flavobacteria
Bacteria described in 2017